Stopford Augustus Brooke (14 November 1832 – 18 March 1916) was an Irish churchman, royal chaplain and writer.

He was born in the rectory of Glendoen, near Letterkenny, Donegal, Ireland, of which parish his maternal grandfather, Joseph Stopford, was then rector. He was the eldest son of the Rev. Richard Sinclair Brooke, later incumbent of the Mariners' church, Kingstown (now Dún Laoghaire), and was educated at Trinity College, Dublin.  He was ordained in the Church of England in 1857 and held various charges in London. From 1863 to 1865 he was chaplain to the Empress Frederick in Berlin. In 1869 with his brother Edward he made long tours of Donegal and Sligo, and spent much time at Kells studying Irish antiquities.  Between 1866 and 1875  he was the minister at St James's Chapel, a Proprietary Chapel, and after it closed he took services at Bedford Chapel, Bloomsbury where he continued to attract large congregations. In 1875, he became chaplain in ordinary to Queen Victoria. But in 1880 he seceded from the Church, being no longer able to accept its leading dogmas, and officiated as an independent preacher for some years at Bedford chapel, Bloomsbury.

Bedford chapel was pulled down about 1894, and from that time he had no church of his own, but his eloquence and powerful religious personality continued to make themselves felt among a wide circle. A man of independent means, he was always keenly interested in literature and art, and a fine critic of both.  The two-volume Life and Letters of Stopford Brooke, written by his son-in-law L. P. Jacks and published in 1917, contains many details of different facets of his life.

In 1890-1 he took the lead in raising the funds to purchase Dove Cottage, William Wordsworth's home in Grasmere from 1800 to 1808, and establishing it “for the eternal possession of those who love English poetry all over the world". Dove Cottage is now administered by the Wordsworth Trust.

Brooke published in 1865 his Life and Letters of FW Robertson (of Brighton), and in 1876 wrote an admirable primer of English Literature (new and revised ed., 1900—but see below), followed in 1892 by The History of Early English Literature (2 vols, 1892) down to the accession of Alfred the Great, and English Literature from the Beginnings to the Norman Conquest (1898).

He gave the inaugural lecture to the Irish Literary Society, London, on "The Need and Use of Getting Irish Literature into the English Tongue" (Bloomsbury House, 11 March 1893).

He delivered a sermon on "The Kingdom of God Within" to the International Council of Unitarian and Other Liberal Religious Thinkers and Workers, meeting in London in May 1901.

His other works include:
various volumes of sermons
Poems (1888)
Dove Cottage (1890)
Theology in the English Poets Cowper, Coleridge, Wordsworth, Burns (1874)
Notes on the Liber Studiorum of J. M. W. Turner (1885; a later publication on the same subject "suggested by the writings of Mr. Ruskin")
Tennyson, his Art and Relation to Modern Life (1894)
A Treasury of Irish Poetry in the English Tongue (co-edited with his son-in-law T.W.Rolleston) (1900)
The Poetry of Robert Browning (1902)
On Ten Plays of Shakespeare (1905)
The Life Superlative (1906)

Brooke married Emma Wentworth-Beaumont (1830-1874) on 23 March 1858. They had six daughters, the eldest of whom was the social reformer Honor Brooke, and two sons, including Stopford Brooke, a Member of Parliament from 1906 to 1910.  Brooke's second daughter Maud married T. W. Rolleston, the Irish writer; his fourth daughter Olive married L. P. Jacks, philosopher, Unitarian minister and Principal of Manchester College, Oxford; and his fifth daughter Sybil married L. Leslie Brooke, the artist of children's books: their son Henry was to become Home Secretary.

Brooke's published letters record that his work brought him into touch with most of his famous contemporaries - including Alfred, Lord Tennyson, Burne-Jones, William Morris, Viscount Bryce, James Martineau and Matthew Arnold.

References
General

Specific

External links
 
 
 Life and works of Stopford A. Brooke, from Ricorso
 Mary Lago Collection at the University of Missouri Libraries

1832 births
1916 deaths
Alumni of Trinity College Dublin
19th-century English Anglican priests
Irish Unitarians
People from Letterkenny
People from County Donegal